Markus Anthony Howard (born March 3, 1999) is an American professional basketball player for Saski Baskonia of the Spanish Liga ACB and the EuroLeague. He played college basketball for the Marquette Golden Eagles, where he was a two-time All-American and led the nation in scoring in the 2019–20 season.

High school career
Howard began his high school career at Perry High School in Gilbert, Arizona. As a freshman, he started in the backcourt with his brother and averaged 23 points per game, leading his team to the state semifinals. He committed to Arizona State following his freshman season. After a sophomore season where he averaged 32.4 points per game, Howard decommitted from Arizona State and reopened up his recruitment.

For his junior season, Howard transferred to national basketball power Findlay Prep in Henderson, Nevada. During his junior season at Findlay Prep, where he led the team in scoring, Howard announced that he would reclassify to the class of 2016 and signed with Marquette.

College career
As a freshman at Marquette University, Howard entered the starting lineup and averaged 13.2 points per game and led the country in three-point shooting at 54.7%. He was named to the 2017 Big East Conference All-Freshman team. As a sophomore, Howard became one of college basketball's top scorers. On the season, Howard averaged 20.4 points per game and was named second-team All-Big East. He also finished the season with the NCAA’s second-best free throw percentage (93.8%).

Going into his junior season of 2018–19, Howard earned national preseason recognition, appearing on the watch lists for the Wooden Award, the Naismith Award and the Bob Cousy Award for top point guard. Howard was also selected preseason first-team All-Big East. In Marquette's non-conference schedule, Howard recorded two 45-point games, against ranked teams Kansas State and Buffalo. In the Buffalo win, Howard scored 40 of his total in the second half. He scored a career-high 53 points in an overtime win over Creighton on January 9, 2019, breaking a Big East single-game record.

Howard became Marquette's all-time leading scorer when he contributed 38 points in an 88–53 victory against Loyola (Md.) in the team's season opener of his senior year. He was named Big East player of the week on November 11, 2019. On November 29, Howard scored 51 points in a 101–79 win over USC. He became the third player to score 50 points in a game in three straight seasons, joining Wayman Tisdale and Pete Maravich. In addition, since he scored 40 points in the previous match, he joined Maravich, Johnny Neumann, and Bob Pettit as the only players in major conferences to score 40 points on back-to-back days. Howard sat out a game against Jacksonville on December 4 with a concussion. On February 12, 2020, Howard scored 24 points and had five rebounds and two assists in a 72–71 loss to Villanova. He became the Big East's all-time leading scorer in league games, surpassing Lawrence Moten's 1,405 points. At the conclusion of the regular season, Howard was unanimously selected to the First Team All-Big East. Howard averaged 27.8 points and 3.3 assists per game as a senior.
During his time at Marquette University, Howard accumulated 2761 points.

Professional career

Denver Nuggets (2020–2022)
After going undrafted in the 2020 NBA draft, Howard signed a two-way deal with the Denver Nuggets whose official announcement was released on November 30, 2020. On May 13, 2021, Howard scored a career-high 15 points in a 114–103 win over the Minnesota Timberwolves. He re-signed with the Nuggets on a new two-way contract on August 15, 2021.  Howard appeared in 31 games and had two 20-point performances during the 2021–22 season.

Cazoo Baskonia (2022–Present)
On July 17, 2022, the Spanish team, Cazoo Baskonia, has announced the signing of Howard into a 2-year deal. In October 2022, Howard became the eighth player ever to score 30 points or more in back-to-back games in the EuroLeague. He scored 33 points against KK Partizan on October 14, 2022 and 30 points against Crvena Zvezda on October 19, 2022.

National team career
Howard has represented the United States in FIBA play on two occasions. In 2015, he was a member of the gold medal-winning US team in the 2015 FIBA Americas Under-16 Championship. Howard then won a gold medal at the 2016 FIBA Under-17 World Championship in Zaragoza, Spain. In the U17 tournament, Howard averaged 11.9 points and 2.6 assists per game.

Career statistics

NBA

Regular season

|-
| style="text-align:left;"|
| style="text-align:left;"|Denver
| 37 || 1 || 5.5 || .377 || .277 || .778 || .6 || .5 || .1 || .0 || 2.8
|-
| style="text-align:left;"|
| style="text-align:left;"|Denver
| 31 || 0 || 5.7 || .386 || .400 || .870 || .4 || .2 || .3 || .0 || 4.1
|- class="sortbottom"
| style="text-align:center;" colspan="2"| Career
| 68 || 1 || 5.6 || .382 || .341 || .844 || .5 || .4 || .2 || .0 || 3.4

Playoffs

|-
| style="text-align:left;"|2021
| style="text-align:left;"|Denver
| 9 || 0 || 12.4 || .405 || .423 || .500 || .8 || .4 || .0 || .1 || 4.7

College

|-
| style="text-align:left;"| 2016–17
| style="text-align:left;"| Marquette
| 31 || 27 || 22.0 || .506 || .547 || .889 || 2.2 || 2.3 || .8 || .1 || 13.2
|-
| style="text-align:left;"| 2017–18
| style="text-align:left;"| Marquette
| 34 || 31 || 31.5 || .464 || .404 || .938 || 3.2 || 2.8 || 1.0 || .1 || 20.4
|-
| style="text-align:left;"| 2018–19
| style="text-align:left;"| Marquette
| 34 || 34 || 33.5 || .420 || .403 || .890 || 4.0 || 3.9 || 1.1 || .0 || 25.0
|-
| style="text-align:left;"| 2019–20
| style="text-align:left;"| Marquette
| 29 || 29 || 33.2 || .422 || .412 || .847 || 3.5 || 3.3 || .9 || .0 || style="background:#cfecec;" | 27.8*
|- class="sortbottom"
| style="text-align:center;" colspan="2"| Career
| 128 || 121 || 30.1 || .444 || .427 || .882 || 3.2 || 3.1 || 1.0 || .0 || 21.6

Personal life
Howard's older brother Jordan Howard played college basketball for Central Arkansas and was the 2018 Southland Conference Player of the Year. The brothers were teammates for one season at Perry High. He is of Puerto Rican descent.

Howard is very public about his Christian faith. Howard explained the reason why he wears number 0 by saying, “First and foremost, I’m a Christian before anything else. I’m a son [of God], so I want to be sure that my number meant something and it represented something. It truly represents that without my relationship with Christ, I feel like I am not the person that I’m meant to be.“ In 2018, Howard started a Fellowship of Christian Athletes club at Marquette.

See also
List of NCAA Division I men's basketball season scoring leaders
List of NCAA Division I men's basketball season 3-point field goal leaders
List of NCAA Division I men's basketball career scoring leaders
List of NCAA Division I men's basketball career 3-point scoring leaders

References

External links
Marquette Golden Eagles bio
USA Basketball bio

1999 births
Living people
All-American college men's basketball players
American men's basketball players
American expatriate basketball people in Spain
American people of Puerto Rican descent
Basketball players from Arizona
Basketball players from New Jersey
Denver Nuggets players
Findlay Prep alumni
Grand Rapids Gold players
Liga ACB players
Marquette Golden Eagles men's basketball players
People from Morristown, New Jersey
Saski Baskonia players
Shooting guards
Sportspeople from Chandler, Arizona
Sportspeople from Morris County, New Jersey
Undrafted National Basketball Association players